The Swan Princess: Music From The Motion Picture is the soundtrack to the Animated Feature The Swan Princess. The single "Far Longer than Forever" performed by Regina Belle and Jeffrey Osborne, was nominated for a Golden Globe Award.

Track listings 

 Note, The short song sung in between the songs "Princesses On Parade" called "No Fear (Reprise)" in the film is not sung in the soundtrack version of the song.
 Note 2, A deleted song called "Forever In My Heart" what eventually became "Far Longer than Forever".
 Note 3, A deleted song called "Rothbart's Song" (also known as "Song of the Castle") what eventually became "No More Mr. Nice Guy".
 Note 4, A deleted song called "Go For It" what eventually became "No Fear".

The Animated Classic Soundtrack track listing 
 "Prologue" - 3:03
 "This Is My Idea" - 6:08
 "Rothbart Attacks King William" - 1:31
 "Practice, Practice, Practice" - 2:22
 "The Enchanted Castle" - 2:12
 "Far Longer Than Forever" - 2:24
 "Jean-Bob's Theme" - 1:01
 "No Fear" - 3:35
 "It's Not What It Seems" - 1:45
 "Derek Finds Odette" - 1:44
 "No More Mr. Nice Guy" - 2:37
 "Princesses On Parade" - 4:04
 "Gator-Aid" - 2:48
 "Odette Flies/Derek Gallops" - 1:40
 "End Credits" - 1:31
 "Eternity" - 3:28

Crew 
Music Score by Lex de Azevedo

Songs: Music by Lex de Azevedo; Lyrics by David Zippel

"Eternity" written by Masato Nakamura, Miwa Yoshida, Mike Pela, and David Zippel

Executive in Charge of Music for New Line Cinema: Toby Emmerich

References 

1994 soundtrack albums
Soundtrack
Sony Wonder soundtracks
Musical film soundtracks
Fantasy film soundtracks